Mir Laiq Ali Khan, Salar Jung II  (died 7 July 1889) was a former Prime Minister of Hyderabad State (1884–1887). He belonged to the noble Salar Jung family. He is also known for authoring the Persian-language travelogue Vaqayeʿ-e Mosaferat.

Early life 
Mir Laiq Ali Khan was the son of Mir Turab Ali Khan, Salar Jung I. He was educated at the Madrasa-i-Aliya, and subsequently studied in England in 1882, for less than a year. In 1883, he received the title of 'Salar Jung  from the Nizam of Hyderabad.

 Prime Minister of Hyderabad State 
In 1884, aged twenty-two, Salar Jung II was appointed diwan (Prime Minister) of Hyderabad. During his tenure, he ordered the official language of Hyderabad State to be shifted from Persian to Urdu. Though initially close to the incumbent Nizam, Mahboob Ali Khan, he later fell out of favour and resigned from the post of Prime Minister in April 1887.

 Later life 
In May 1887, Salar Jung II embarked on a tour of Europe, managed by entrepreneur Moreton Frewen. Towards the end of his journey, while venturing in England, he was awarded the title Knight Commander of the Indian Empire by Queen Victoria. He documented his experiences abroad in a Persian-language travelogue titled 'Vaqayeʿ-e Mosaferat. The work is one of the last Indo-Persian travelogues.

Death 
Salar Jung II died of an alcohol-related illness on 7 July 1889, two months after he returned to Hyderabad from his journey. He was aged 27. His son, Mir Yousuf Ali Khan, Salar Jung III, born 04 June 1889, was only one month old at this time.

See also
Salar Jung family

References

Salar Jung family
Indian Muslims
Prime Ministers of Hyderabad State
Knights Commander of the Order of the Indian Empire
Year of birth missing
1889 deaths